William Passmore may refer to:

 William Passmore (boxer) (1915–1986), South African boxer and Olympic competitor
 William J. Passmore (1933–2009), American jockey
 William L. Passmore (1910–2002), American jockey and Thoroughbred trainer
 William T. Passmore (1882–1955), American lacrosse player
Will Passmore, EastEnders character